The Flag of Pandya was used by the Pandyan Dynasty and consisted of the single fish or twin fish. There is no reference or description about the flag. Therefore, any Pandya flags used in media are created for the purpose of illustration. There are flags with double fish or single fish as per archaeological findings and historians's illustration.

12th-century Tamil court poet Ottakoothar wrote a verse mentions about Pandya flag while comparing to Chola flag.

Literal Meaning: Can the flag of the Pandyas match the flag of the Cholas?

Legend 

According to legend, Avatar of the Hindu Goddess Meenaatchi, who has fish shaped eyes, was born as the daughter of a Pandya king. Pandya emblem was a fish and it represented the dynasty, including in coins, etc. The word Meenatchi (Meen+Aatchi ) is a mix of the Tamil words Meen (Fish) and Aatchi (Rule), which means Fish Rule.

See also 
 Flags of Tamils
 Flag of Chola
 Flag of Pallava

References 

Pandyan dynasty
Pandya
Pandya
Flags displaying animals